Micigliano is a  (municipality) in the Province of Rieti in the Italian region of Latium, located about  northeast of Rome and about  northeast of Rieti.

Micigliano borders the following municipalities: Antrodoco, Borbona, Borgo Velino, Cantalice, Castel Sant'Angelo, Cittaducale, Leonessa, Posta, Rieti.

Demographic evolution

References

Cities and towns in Lazio